Dekeyser's nectar bat (Lonchophylla dekeyseri) is a bat species found in Brazil and Bolivia.

Discovery and etymology
This species was initially encountered in August 1970 in Brasília National Park. It was described in 1983 by Valdir Taddei, Luiz Vizotto, and Ivan Sazima. The species was named dekeyseri in honor of French zoologist Pierre Louis Dekeyser.

Description
Their dental formula is  Their abdomens are paler than their backs. It is considered one of the smaller members of its genus. They have a relatively short skull compared to other Lonchophylla species.
The lower lip is grooved, and bordered with small, wart-like protuberances.

Biology and ecology
Home ranges consist of almost equal parts of the cerrado biome and pasture. It feeds on nectar. Plants comprising its diet include Hymenaea stigonocarpa, members of the Bauhinia genus (B. cupulata, B. multinervia, B. brevipes, B. megalandra, B. pauletia, B. ungulata, B. rufa), and Luehea trees. They also consume nectar from plants of the Lafoensia and Pseudobombax genera. In the dry season, which is when nectar is most abundant, they feed predominantly on nectar. In the wet season, however, they will increase their insect and fruit consumption. 

Pups are found July through November. They are thought to be monoestrous, breeding only once per year. Because the roosts contain more females than males, it is possible that they have a harem social structure. They emerge from their roosts shortly after dusk, and return just before dawn in the rainy season. In the dry season, they will return briefly around midnight before leaving again, returning again before dawn. They have 28 chromosomes.

Habitat and range
This bat is endemic to the Cerrado of Brazil. It is dependent on caves for its roosts during the day. It is found in dry forests with calcareous outcroppings.

Conservation
One of the threats to this species is inappropriate efforts to eradicate vampire bats. Vampire bat culling techniques are often applied indiscriminately, and end up killing other species of bat, including endangered species. Methods include lighting dynamite in caves or cementing caves shut during the day while bats are roosting. Current vampire bat management practices have serious and significant negative effects on its population.
In 1996, this species was evaluated as vulnerable by the IUCN, which was later revised to near threatened in 2008. In 2016, its status was again revised to endangered. It is listed as endangered because the population likely consists of fewer than 2,500 individuals, its distribution is patchy and limited, and its suitable habitat is rapidly declining.
There are six identified subpopulations; each is thought to have fewer than 100 individuals. Because it is associated with karstic landscapes, it is threatened by disturbance from mining.

References

Lonchophylla
Bats of South America
Bats of Brazil
Mammals of Bolivia
Mammals described in 1983